They Learned About Women is a 1930 American Pre-Code sports drama musical film directed by Jack Conway and Sam Wood, and starring Van and Schenck in their final film appearance together.

Although predominantly a black and white film, the "Harlem Madness" number was filmed in Technicolor under the direction of Sammy Lee. The film is a "talkie", but MGM also issued it in a silent version, with Alfred Block writing the titles. The film was remade in 1949 as Take Me Out to the Ball Game.  During production, it was known by at least two other titles, "Take It Big," and "Playing the Field."

Plot 
Major league baseball player Jack Glennon (Schenck) watches out for alcoholic teammate Jerry Burke (Van). Both men are interested in Mary (Love), but Jack marries the gold-digging Daisy (Doran), who lures him away from baseball to the vaudeville stage.

Later, Jerry and Mary become romantically involved, and Jack rejoins the baseball team after divorcing Daisy. Jerry notices that Jack is not playing well and is unhappy, and realizes that he must still be in love with Mary. He steps away from Mary, allowing her to be with Jack. Jack plays baseball well once again, and the team wins the World Series.

Cast

Reception 
The film received lukewarm reviews.

Soundtrack 
 "Ain't You, Baby?"
Music by Milton Ager
Lyrics by Jack Yellen
Performed by Gus Van
 "Does My Baby Love?"
Music by Milton Ager
Lyrics by Jack Yellen
Performed by Gus Van and Joe Schenck
 "Harlem Madness"
Music by Milton Ager
Lyrics by Jack Yellen
Performed by Gus Van and Joe Schenck
Reprised by Nina Mae McKinney and chorus (in Technicolor)
 "He's That Kind of a Pal"
Music by Milton Ager
Lyrics by Jack Yellen
Performed by Gus Van and Joe Schenck (twice)
 "A Man of My Own"
Music by Milton Ager
Lyrics by Jack Yellen
Performed by Bessie Love
 "Ten Sweet Mamas"
Music by Milton Ager
Lyrics by Jack Yellen
Performed by Gus Van, Joe Schenck, and ball players
 "There Will Never Be Another Mary"
Music by Milton Ager
Lyrics by Jack Yellen
Performed by Joe Schenck
 "Dougherty Is the Name"
Music by Milton Ager
Lyrics by Jack Yellen and Gus Van
Performed by Gus Van and Joe Schenck
 "I'm an Old-Fashioned Guy"
Music by Milton Ager
Lyrics by Jack Yellen and Gus Van
Performed by Gus Van and Joe Schenck
 "When You Wore a Tulip and I Wore a Big Red Rose"
Music by Percy Wenrich (1924)
Lyrics by Jack Mahoney
Sung by the players in the hotel lobby
 "When You Were Sweet Sixteen"
Written by James Thornton (1898)
Sung partially by Tom Dugan and Benny Rubin

References

External links 
 
 
 
 They Learned About Women at Sanderson Beck page

1930 films
1930s musical drama films
1930s sports drama films
1930s color films
American baseball films
American black-and-white films
American musical drama films
Films directed by Jack Conway
Films directed by Sam Wood
Metro-Goldwyn-Mayer films
1930 drama films
1930s English-language films
1930s American films
American sports drama films